The Bosphorus Bridge, known officially as the 15 July Martyrs Bridge and unofficially as the First Bridge, is one of the three suspension bridges spanning the Bosphorus strait (Turkish: Boğaziçi) in Istanbul, Turkey, thus connecting Europe and Asia (alongside Fatih Sultan Mehmet Bridge and Yavuz Sultan Selim Bridge). The bridge extends between Ortaköy (in Europe) and Beylerbeyi (in Asia).

It is a gravity-anchored suspension bridge with steel towers and inclined hangers. The aerodynamic deck hangs on steel cables.

Upon its completion in 1973, the Bosphorus Bridge had the fourth-longest suspension bridge span in the world, and the longest outside the United States (only the Verrazano-Narrows Bridge, Golden Gate Bridge and Mackinac Bridge had a longer span in 1973). The Bosphorus Bridge remained the longest suspension bridge in Europe until the completion of the Humber Bridge in 1981, and the longest suspension bridge in Asia until the completion of the Fatih Sultan Mehmet Bridge (Second Bosphorus Bridge) in 1988 (which was surpassed by the Minami Bisan-Seto Bridge in 1989). Currently, the Bosphorus Bridge has the 40th-longest suspension bridge span in the world.

After a group of soldiers took control and partially closed off the bridge during the military coup d'état attempt on 15 July 2016, Prime Minister Binali Yıldırım proclaimed on 25 July 2016 the decision of the Cabinet of Turkey that the bridge will be formally renamed as the 15 Temmuz Şehitler Köprüsü (July 15th Martyrs Bridge) in memory of those killed while resisting the attempted coup.

The Bosphorus Bridge is famous for its important transport routes, connecting parts of Europe to Turkey.

Precedents and proposals
The idea of a bridge crossing the Bosphorus dates back to antiquity. The Greek writer Herodotus says in his Histories that, on the orders of Emperor Darius the Great of the Achaemenid Empire (522 BC–485 BC), Mandrocles of Samos once engineered a pontoon bridge across the Bosphorus, linking Asia to Europe; this bridge enabled Darius to pursue the fleeing Scythians as well as position his army in the Balkans to overwhelm Macedon. Leonardo da Vinci proposed a suspension bridge to Sultan Bayezid II in 1502 or 1503. The first modern project for a permanent bridge across the Bosphorus was proposed to Sultan Abdul Hamid II of the Ottoman Empire by the Bosphorus Railroad Company in 1900, which included a rail link between the continents.

Construction

The decision to build a bridge across the Bosphorus was taken in 1957 by Prime Minister Adnan Menderes. For the structural engineering work, a contract was signed with the British firm Freeman Fox & Partners in 1968. The bridge was designed by the British civil engineers Gilbert Roberts, William Brown and Michael Parsons, who also designed the Humber Bridge, Severn Bridge, and Forth Road Bridge. Construction started in February 1970 and ceremonies were attended by President Cevdet Sunay and Prime Minister Süleyman Demirel. The bridge was built by the Turkish firm Enka Construction & Industry Co. along with the co-contractors Cleveland Bridge & Engineering Company (England) and Hochtief AG (Germany).

The bridge was completed on 30 October 1973, one day after the 50th anniversary of the founding of the Republic of Turkey, and opened by President Fahri Korutürk and Prime Minister Naim Talu. The cost of the bridge was US$200 million ($ in  dollars).

Upon the bridge's opening, much was made of its being the first bridge between Europe and Asia since the pontoon bridge of Xerxes in 480 BC. That bridge, however, spanned the Hellespont (Dardanelles), some distance away from the Bosphorus, and was the second bridge after the above-mentioned bridge built by Emperor Darius I The Great across the Bosphorus in 513 BC.

Operation and tolls

The bridge highway is eight lanes wide. Three standard lanes, one emergency lane and one pedestrian lane serve each direction. On weekday mornings, most commuter traffic flows westbound to Europe, so four of the six lanes run westbound and only two eastbound. Conversely, on weekday evenings, four lanes are dedicated to eastbound traffic and two lanes, to westbound traffic.

For the first three years, pedestrians could walk over the bridge, reaching it with elevators inside the towers on both sides. No pedestrians or commercial vehicles, such as trucks, are allowed to use the bridge today.

Today, around 180,000 vehicles pass daily in both directions, with almost 85% being cars. On 29 December 1997, the one-billionth vehicle passed the bridge.

It is a toll bridge, and a toll plaza with 13 toll booths is situated near the bridge on the Asian side. A toll is charged for passing from Europe to Asia, but not for passing in the reverse direction.

Since 1999, some of the toll booths (#9 - #13), located to the far left as motorists approach them, are unmanned and equipped only with a remote payment system (Turkish: OGS) in order to not delay traffic. In addition to OGS, another toll pay system with special contactless smart cards (Turkish: KGS) was installed at specific toll booths in 2005.

Since 3 April 2006, toll booths accept no cash but only OGS or KGS. An OGS device or KGS card can be obtained at various stations before reaching the toll plazas of highways and bridges. In 2006, the toll was 3.00 TL or about $2.00.

Since April 2007, a computerised LED lighting system of changing colours and patterns, developed by Philips, illuminates the bridge at night.

In 2012, KGS was replaced with the new HGS system, which uses radio-frequency identification (RFID) technology.

In 2017, the toll increased by nearly 50% from 4.75 to 7 TRY.  (On March 10, 2022, 7 Turkish TRY is worth $0.68US.  Data from currencymatrix.com )

After 21 months, in late 2019, the toll went up another 20% to 10.50 TRY. The TRY value has dropped considerably in the first quarter of 2022. On March 10, 2022, 10.50 TRY was equivalent to $0.74US.

Tolls need to be increased almost every year to keep up with high producers’ price inflation.

History

Every October, the annual Intercontinental Istanbul Eurasia Marathon crosses the bridge on its way from Asia to Europe. During the marathon, the bridge is closed to vehicular traffic.

In October, visitors participate in the 'fun run' and cross the bridge on foot. Many take picnics to enjoy the view.

The bridge was depicted on the reverse of the Turkish 1000 lira banknotes of 1978–1986.

On 15 May 2005 at 07:00 local time, U.S. tennis star Venus Williams played a show game with Turkish player İpek Şenoğlu on the bridge, the first tennis match played on two continents. The event promoted the upcoming 2005 WTA İstanbul Cup and lasted five minutes. After the exhibition, they both threw a tennis ball into the Bosphorus.

On 17 July 2005 at 10:30 local time, British Formula One driver David Coulthard drove his Red Bull racing car across the bridge from the European side to the Asian side, then, after turning with a powerslide at the toll plaza, back to the European side for show. He parked his car in the garden of Dolmabahçe Palace where his ride had started. While crossing the bridge with his Formula 1 car, Coulthard was picked up by the automatic surveillance system and charged with a fine of 20 Euros because he passed through the toll booths without payment. His team agreed to pay for him.

On 5 November 2013, World No. 1 golfer Tiger Woods, visiting for the 2013 Turkish Airlines Open golf tournament held between 7 and 10 November, was brought to the bridge by helicopter and made a couple of show shots on the bridge, hitting balls from the Asian side to the European side on one side of the bridge, which was closed to traffic for about one hour.

On 15 July 2016, the bridge was blocked by a faction of the Turkish Armed Forces during a coup attempt. They also arrested civilians and police officers. Some tanks ran over vehicles. The soldiers involved surrendered to police and to civilians the next day.

On 25 July 2016, prime minister Binali Yıldırım announced that the bridge would be renamed as the 15 Temmuz Şehitler Köprüsü (July 15 Martyrs Bridge).

See also 

 Fatih Sultan Mehmet Bridge
 Yavuz Sultan Selim Bridge
 Osman Gazi Bridge
 Çanakkale 1915 Bridge
 Eurasia Tunnel, undersea tunnel, crossing the Bosphorus for vehicular traffic, opened in December 2016.
 Marmaray, undersea rail tunnel connecting the Asian and European sides of Istanbul.
 Great Istanbul Tunnel, a proposed three-level road-rail undersea tunnel.
 Public transport in Istanbul
 Rail transport in Turkey
 Turkish Straits

Notes and references

External links

 WowTurkey: Bosphorus Bridge Photos (Daytime)
 WowTurkey: Bosphorus Bridge Photos (Night)
 Live traffic camera pictures
 
 Satellite image from Google
 Bosphorus Bridge Panoramics In Istanbul | Turkey 
 3D-model ″First Bosphorus Bridge″ for Google Earth

Beşiktaş
Bosphorus crossings
Bridges completed in 1973
Bridges in Istanbul
Road bridges in Turkey
Suspension bridges in Turkey
Toll bridges in Turkey
Üsküdar
1973 establishments in Turkey